The Pylochelidae are a family of hermit crabs. Its members are commonly called the 'symmetrical hermit crabs'. Due to their cryptic nature and relative scarcity, only around 60 specimens had been collected before 1987, when a monograph was published detailing a further 400.

Description
Unlike other hermit crabs, pylochelid hermit crabs are not markedly asymmetrical, with a straight body and equal numbers of appendages on both sides. This characteristic, together with the partial calcification of the abdomen (which is soft in other hermit crabs) led Edward J. Miers, when describing the first species, to consider it to represent a transition between hermit crabs and "Macrura" (long-tailed decapods, such as lobsters and shrimp). Correspondingly, pylochelid hermit crabs do not usually inhabit gastropod shells, but instead withdraw into decayed pieces of wood, stones, tusk shells (especially Dentaliidae), living sponges, pieces of bamboo or mangroves. Their claws are often adapted to form an operculum, which closes off the entrance to their home.

Distribution
Although the family as a whole has a global distribution, diversity is concentrated in the Indo-Pacific, with only four species being found in the western Atlantic Ocean and Caribbean Sea (Cheiroplatea scutata, Pylocheles agassizii, Bathycheles cubensis and Mixtopagurus paradoxus).

Genera
The family contains 41 species in 10 genera:
Bathycheles – six species
Cancellocheles – one species
Cheiroplatea – six species
† Cretatrizocheles – one species
Forestocheles – one species
Mixtopagurus – one species
Pomatocheles – three species
Pylocheles – two species
Trizocheles – 18 species
Xylocheles – two species

References

External links

Hermit crabs
Extant Late Jurassic first appearances
Decapod families